Thubana albinulla is a moth in the family Lecithoceridae. It was described by C. Wu in 1994. It is found in China (Sichuan).

References

Moths described in 1994
Thubana